Enterprise is a city in and the county seat of Wallowa County, Oregon, United States. The population was 1,940 in the 2010 census.

History 

Enterprise was platted in 1886, and in 1887 residents considered Bennett Flat, Wallowa City, Franklin, and other possibilities before voting for Enterprise during a community meeting in a tent owned by a mercantile company. The name was meant to reflect "the policy of its inhabitants". In November 1887, a post office was established in the community, and Catherine Akin became the first postmaster. The city was incorporated by the Oregon Legislative Assembly on February 21, 1889.

Geography

Demographics

2010 census
As of the census of 2010, there were 1,940 people, 871 households, and 522 families residing in the city. The racial makeup of the city was 95.9% White, 0.3% African American, 0.6% Native American, 0.5% Asian, 0.1% Pacific Islander, 0.5% from other races, and 2.2% from two or more races. Hispanic or Latino of any race were 3.1% of the population.

There were 871 households, of which 24.8% had children under the age of 18 living with them, 47.1% were married couples living together, 9.1% had a female householder with no husband present, 3.8% had a male householder with no wife present, and 40.1% were non-families. 34.6% of all households were made up of individuals, and 13.9% had someone living alone who was 65 years of age or older. The average household size was 2.17 and the average family size was 2.78.

The median age in the city was 46 years. 21.2% of residents were under the age of 18; 5.9% were between the ages of 18 and 24; 21.8% were from 25 to 44; 29.5% were from 45 to 64; and 21.6% were 65 years of age or older. The gender makeup of the city was 48.1% male and 51.9% female.

2000 census
As of the census of 2000, there were 1,895 people, 821 households, and 522 families residing in the city. The population density was 1,289.7 people per square mile (497.7/km2). There were 952 housing units at an average density of 647.9 per square mile (250.0/km2). The racial makeup of the city was 96.46% White, 0.05% African American, 0.95% Native American, 0.32% Asian, 1.06% from other races, and 1.16% from two or more races. Hispanic or Latino of any race were 1.64% of the population.

There were 821 households, out of which 28.6% had children under the age of 18 living with them, 50.8% were married couples living together, 8.8% had a female householder with no husband present, and 36.4% were non-families. 32.0% of all households were made up of individuals, and 13.9% had someone living alone who was 65 years of age or older. The average household size was 2.23 and the average family size was 2.80.

In the city, the population was spread out, with 24.3% under the age of 18, 5.2% from 18 to 24, 22.5% from 25 to 44, 27.1% from 45 to 64, and 20.9% who were 65 years of age or older. The median age was 44 years. For every 100 females, there were 95.6 males. For every 100 females age 18 and over, there were 91.1 males.

The median income for a household in the city was $31,429, and the median income for a family was $39,338. Males had a median income of $29,688 versus $22,232 for females. The per capita income for the city was $16,755. About 6.7% of families and 11.3% of the population were below the poverty line, including 13.6% of those under age 18 and 7.4% of those age 65 or over.

Climate
Enterprise has a humid continental climate (Köppen Climate Classification Dfb), one of the less common climate types in Oregon.

On June 11, 1968, an F2 tornado hit Wallowa County, north of Enterprise. About  of prime timber were destroyed, with an estimated loss of between 5 and 50 million dollars.

Economy
Enterprise has numerous privately owned and operated restaurants including The Range Rider Cafe, Heavenly's, The Red Rooster, Cloud Nine Bakery and Cafe, Sugertime Bakery, Happy Garden (Chinese food), and Thai Enterprise. It has one chain store and a Subway sandwich shop.  The Terminal Gravity Brewery and Pub, which distributes statewide, is located here.

The Wallowa Memorial Hospital is a primary employer.

Many cattlemen and farmers live in the Enterprise area, including representatives of the Oregon Cattleman's Association, the Wallowa County Stockgrowers, and other groups. Livestock continues to be the largest sector of Wallowa County's agricultural economy, which is vastly dominated by cattle. There are currently over 24,000 mother cows in the permanent herds with an additional 8,000 cattle from other areas grazing for the summer. There is nearly 5,000 head of sheep that summer in the county. These operations produce over $17.9 million of farm gate sales.
The crops portion of agriculture is much more diversified with nearly 9,000 acres of wheat, 4,200 acres of barley, with nearly 29,000 acres of hay (alfalfa, grass, and grain) grown. Added to the incidental "tree farm" income, crops in Wallowa County produce over $25 million. The total agricultural farm gate sales for Wallowa County was $43,519,000 in 2007.
Enterprise has several commercial greenhouses that sell nursery stock and numerous individuals within the local community also grow vegetables in private greenhouses. The organization of private growers into a brokerage is an ongoing project and several private growers feature their wares at the Enterprise Farmers Market every Saturday throughout the summer.

Two bronze foundries, Parks Bronze and TW Bronze, are situated in Enterprise.  Numerous artists, craftsmen and musicians call Enterprise home.

Education

Enterprise High School

Media
 The Wallowa County Chieftain  The newspaper of record, in continuous publication since 1884
 Wallowa Valley Online

Radio

 KWVR (AM) 1340
 KWVR-FM 92.1
 KWRL FM 102.3
 KCMB FM 104.7

Infrastructure

Transportation
Enterprise Municipal Airport

Notable people
William B. Ault, US Navy commander during World War II; posthumous recipient of the Navy Cross.
 Carol D'Onofrio, public health researcher (1936-2020). Grew up in Enterprise, Oregon.
Dale T. Mortensen, awarded a Nobel Prize in Economics.
Mike Rich, screenwriter.
Blaine Stubblefield, founder of the annual National Oldtime Fiddlers' Contest

References

External links

 Entry for Enterprise in the Oregon Blue Book

 
Cities in Oregon
County seats in Oregon
Cities in Wallowa County, Oregon
1886 establishments in Oregon
Populated places established in 1886